Xaver Höger (7 April 1930 – 7 April 2014) was a German long-distance runner. He competed in the men's 10,000 metres at the 1960 Summer Olympics.

References

1930 births
2014 deaths
Athletes (track and field) at the 1960 Summer Olympics
German male long-distance runners
Olympic athletes of the United Team of Germany
Place of birth missing